"Funny Vibe" is a single released by Living Colour from their 1988 debut album Vivid. It features Chuck D and Flavor Flav from Public Enemy.

Rolling Stone magazine wrote about the song in a 1990 Living Colour interview, saying "The words – "No I'm not gonna hurt you/No I'm not gonna harm you/And I try not to hate you/So why you want to give me that/Funny Vibe!" – spelled out with machine-gun eloquence Reid's rage and frustration in communicating his vision to a rigid, unapologetic music industry rife with racial stereotyping and de facto discrimination."

References

External links
Funny Vibe music video by Living Colour

Living Colour songs
1989 singles
1988 songs
Rap metal songs
Songs against racism and xenophobia
Songs written by Vernon Reid
Epic Records singles